Arun Basuljevic (born December 17, 1995) is an American professional soccer player who plays for Monterey Bay FC in the USL Championship.

Career

College & Youth
Basuljevic played three years of college soccer at Georgetown University between 2014 and 2016. 
Basuljevic appeared for USL PDL side New York Red Bulls U-23.
While at Georgetown, Basuljevic was named Soccer America's Freshman of the Year and the Big East Freshman of the Year. Basuljevic was a participant in U-14, U-15 and U-20 National Team Camps.

New York Red Bulls
On January 24, 2017, Basuljevic signed a Homegrown Contract with New York Red Bulls. He made his professional debut with New York Red Bulls II on March 25, 2017, starting in a 3–3 draw with Pittsburgh Riverhounds. He had his first professional assist in the March 25, 2017 game. On August 5, 2017, Basuljevic scored his first goal as a professional, opening the scoring for Red Bulls II in a 2–1 victory over Rochester Rhinos. In October 2017, Basuljevic scored his second goal of the season for New York in a 6–5 victory over Orlando City B.

Fremad Amager
Basuljevic signed for Danish 1st Division club Fremad Amager on 28 February 2018, after a one-week trial at the club. He made his league debut on 18 March 2018 in a 0–0 home draw against Nykøbing FC. He was subbed on for Martin Jensen in the 84th minute.

Nyköpings BIS
Basuljevic joined Division 1 Norra side Nyköpings BIS. He was an integral part in the club's historic  Svenska Cup victory against first division side, GIF Sundsvall, in August 2018.

Fresno FC
On February 18, 2019, Basuljevic joined USL Championship side Fresno FC.

Following the folding of the club, Basuljevic and teammates were free to pursue other options.

Oklahoma City Energy
Basuljevic joined USL Championship side OKC Energy FC.

Monterey Bay FC 
Basuljevic was announced as signing for Monterey Bay FC on February 8, 2022. Basuljevic was included in the starting 11 for Monterey Bay's inaugural match, a 4-2 loss to Phoenix Rising FC.

References

External links
Profile at Guhoyas.com

1995 births
Living people
American expatriate soccer players
American expatriate sportspeople in Denmark
American people of Serbian descent
American soccer players
Association football midfielders
Danish 1st Division players
Expatriate men's footballers in Denmark
Fremad Amager players
Fresno FC players
Homegrown Players (MLS)
Monterey Bay FC players
OKC Energy FC players
Georgetown Hoyas men's soccer players
New York Red Bulls players
New York Red Bulls U-23 players
New York Red Bulls II players
People from Mahopac, New York
Soccer players from New York (state)
Sportspeople from the New York metropolitan area
USL Championship players
USL League Two players